James Franklin Record (June 21, 1861 – 1935) was a pastor, school teacher, and President of Pikeville Collegiate Institute, and later Pikeville College.

Early life
Record was born to Mary Hetty Wyman Record and James Elliot Record in Crawford County, Pennsylvania. He had eleven other siblings, seven brothers and five sisters.

Record attended the country school until high school and he began teaching about this time. During the winter terms he would teach and in the fall and spring terms attend Cochranton High School in Cochranton, Pennsylvania. After high school, Record attended Edinboro State Normal School. While a student there, he taught at Geneva, Pennsylvania and Deckard's run. He also became principal of a two-room public school in Geneva.

After teaching Geneva for a year and still before finishing up at the Normal School, Record he went to Minnesota at the request of a friend who was a county Superintendent of schools. He spent one spring and a summer there before returning to Pennsylvania to be principle of the high school in Cooperstown, Pennsylvania.

In December 1885, Record married Margaret E. Bell. Some years later they gave birth to a daughter named Alice Record. When Alice grew up, she attended Pikeville Collegiate Institute as a student under her father.

After finishing up at Cooperstown in May, Record and his wife spent six weeks in Edinsboro until returning to Cooperstown that following September.  The next year, Cochran secured a position at Deckard's Run. Other than teaching, he and his wife did some religious work in Minnesota and Pennsylvania . The family lived at Cooperstown for less than two years before Record became  pastor in Kasota, Minnesota.

Pikeville College years
On a visit to North Dakota for a job interview, Record met Dr. Fulton, a member of the Board of Trustees of Pikeville Collegiate Institute in Pikeville, Kentucky. The ultimate result of that meeting was Record accepting the pastorate of the First Presbyterian Church of Pikeville and principalship of the Pikeville Collegiate Institute in 1899.

According to books in the Special Collections Room of the University of Pikeville, Record is best remembered for all of his faith in the institution, and for the growth of Pikeville College and education in Pike County. He is said to have inspired many local youth to become teachers.

During the summer of 1905, Record received a Ph.D. degree.  He taught the science of government, psychology, and mathematics at the Institute. His influence in the local public schools was widespread and extended to a number of mountain counties.

During Record's first term at Pikeville, he established a training school for teachers, built a women's dormitory, and organized the first Alumni organization. In 1909, the School Catalogue first carries the name “Pikeville College”.

In 1911, Record left Pikeville to become the Educational Superintendent of the Sabbath School, run by the Presbyterian Church in Michigan.

In 1915, Record resumed his post as president of Pikeville.  During his term, the college gymnasium opened, the first basketball game was played, the first Junior College Graduation was held, the administration building opened and the Wickham Hall opened.

Final years 
Record retired from Pikeville due to the declining health of his wife. He died in 1935.

In 1962, Pikeville College dedicated Record Memorial Hall in his memory.

Record is remembered for a sermon that he delivered to students in the chapel, which closed with the words:

That is a mistaken notion of life preparation that counts the results of it only in dollars and cents. That sees in it only a commercial value, that looks upon it only as a means to an end, and that end the accumulation of wealth. The highest ideal of life is not what I can get out of the world and the people in it, but what can I give to the world and to its people. (53)

References

  

 
 

American educators
1861 births
1935 deaths